Phu Sang is a district (amphoe) of Phayao province in northern Thailand.

Geography
Neighboring districts are (from the south clockwise): Chiang Kham of Phayao Province and Thoeng of Chiang Rai province. To the northeast is Xaignabouli province of Laos.

History
The minor district was established on 26 June 1996. The new district became effective on 15 July and covered five tambons previously belonging to Chiang Kham district.

On 15 May 2007, all 81 minor districts were upgraded to full districts. With publication in the Royal Gazette on 24 August the upgrade became official.

Administration
The district is divided into five sub-districts (tambons), which are further subdivided into 58 villages (mubans). Sop Bong is a sub-district municipality (thesaban tambon) which covers tambon Sop Bong. There are a further four tambon administrative organizations (TAO).

References

External links
amphoe.com

Phu Sang